John Griffiths may refer to:

Politicians and lawyers
John Griffiths (Welsh politician) (born 1956), Welsh Labour Party politician
John Griffiths (Conservative politician) (born 1953), British local government leader
John Griffiths (Liberal politician) (born 1934), British politician and author
John Calvert Griffiths (born 1931), former Attorney General of Hong Kong and lawyer
John L. Griffiths (1855–1914), Consul General of the United States to Britain
John Jones Griffiths (1839–1901), Welsh educationalist and politician

Sportsmen
John Griffiths (cricketer, born 1863) (1863–?), cricketer
John Griffiths (cricketer, born 1931) (1931–1982), cricketer
Jack Griffiths (1909–1975), English footballer
John Griffiths (footballer, born 1876) (1876–1953), English football wing half (Grimsby Town)
John Griffiths (footballer, born 1951) (born 1951), English football midfielder (Aston Villa, Stockport County)

Others
John Griffiths (Medal of Honor) (1835–?), American Civil War soldier and sailor and Medal of Honor recipient
John Griffiths (shipowner) (1801–1881), Australian colonial shipowner and builder
John Griffiths (academic) (1806–1885), English academic and Warden of Wadham College, Oxford
John Griffiths (artist) (1837–1918), artist who worked in India
John Griffiths (curator) (1952–2010), Welsh museum curator
John Griffiths (mathematician) (1837/8–1916), Welsh mathematician
John Griffiths (musician) (born 1952), Australian vihuelist and musicologist
John F. Griffiths (1926–2003), British and American climatologist
John W. Griffiths (1809–1882), American naval architect
SS John W. Griffiths, a Liberty ship
J. Gwyn Griffiths (1911–2004), Welsh poet, Egyptologist and nationalist political activist
John Griffiths (surgeon) (1754–1822), Surgeon to Queen Charlotte's household
John Griffiths (archdeacon of Llandaff) (1820–1897)
John O. Griffiths (1923–2001), British philatelist
John Fraser Griffiths (died 1971), South African who worked as a British colonial official